Bradley "B.C." Kochmit is an American musician, best known as the former lead guitarist for Nonpoint, Dark New Day and Eye Empire. He was once guitarist for Switched.

In 2008, Kochmit left Switched to replace Troy McLawhorn in Dark New Day,

Violent Plan 
In June 2009, it was announced that both Corey Lowery and Kochmit had formed a new group called Violent Plan with singer Donnie Hamby of doubleDrive, and drummer Dan Richardson, of Pro-Pain, Crumbsuckers, Life of Agony and Stereomud, completing a nine-song demo. This group was short lived and by November 2009 had disbanded.

Eye Empire 

In October 2009, Kochmit helped form Eye Empire along with Corey Lowery, Donald Carpenter, and Garrett Whitlock.

References 

American male guitarists
American rock guitarists
Lead guitarists
Living people
Switched (band) members
Dark New Day members
Eye Empire members
Year of birth missing (living people)